The 2003 Pan American Games were held in Santo Domingo, Dominican Republic and surrounding area. The Pan American Games  ran from in July and August 2003.

This is a list of competition venues that were used during the games. 34 Venues will be used, with a majority of them being built for the games.

Olympic Park Cluster

East Park Cluster

Venues elsewhere in Santo Domingo

Venues outside of Santo Domingo

References

 
Venues of the Pan American Games